Kidamycin is an anthracycline antibiotic with anticancer activity. It was first synthesized from a strain of streptomyces bacteria isolated from a soil sample. In clinical trials, Kindamycin showed high effect against gram positive bacteria as well as multiple cancer models including Ehrlich ascites carcinoma, Sarcoma 180, NF-sarcoma, and Yoshida sarcoma.

References

Amino sugars
Antibiotics